Kurt Benesch (17 May 1926  20 January 2008) was an Austrian writer.

Life
His father was a governmental counselor. He finished his primary and secondary educations in Vienna, where he had been born. Later, he made working services in Poland and the military service in Italy. After a British imprisonment, he studied at the University of Vienna, where he received a PhD in literature.

Prizes
 1993 Ernst-und-Rosa-von-Dombrowski-Stiftungspreis

Works
 1955: Die Flucht vor dem Engel. Roman
 1956: Der Maßlose
 1967: Nie zurück!
 1985: Die Spur in der Wüste
 1991: Der Jakobsweg nach Santiago de Compostela
 1993: Die Suche nach Jägerstätter (novela biográfica)

References

External links
 dnb

1926 births
2008 deaths
Austrian male writers
University of Vienna alumni
Writers from Vienna